Xavier Vela Maggi (born 7 August 1989) is a Spanish-born Brazilian rower. He competed in the men's lightweight double sculls event at the 2016 Summer Olympics.

See also
 Rowing at the 2019 Pan American Games
 Pau Vela

References

External links
 

1989 births
Living people
People with acquired Brazilian citizenship
Brazilian male rowers
Olympic rowers of Brazil
Rowers at the 2016 Summer Olympics
World Rowing Championships medalists for Brazil
Rowers at the 2019 Pan American Games
Medalists at the 2019 Pan American Games
Pan American Games medalists in rowing
Pan American Games silver medalists for Brazil
Brazilian people of Spanish descent
People from Tortosa
Sportsmen from Catalonia
Spanish male rowers
European Rowing Championships medalists
Spanish people of Brazilian descent
Sportspeople of Brazilian descent
Sportspeople from the Province of Tarragona